Scutiphora pedicellata is a species of insect in the jewel bug family. The species is found around the eastern coast of Australia in New South Wales, Queensland, South Australia, Tasmania, Victoria

References

External links 
 Images from bie.ala.org.au
  Images from fourthirds-user.com

Agricultural pest insects
Scutelleridae
Insects described in 1826
Hemiptera of Australia